Scarecrow, historically the J.J. Cohn Estate, is a California wine producer. The estate is located in Rutherford, CA, within the Rutherford AVA in the Napa Valley AVA zone.

History
In 1943, Joseph Judson Cohn, an MGM executive producer of films such as The Wizard of Oz acquired the  property of Rutherford land adjacent to Inglenook Winery founded by Gustave Niebaum. In 1945 he was persuaded by his neighbor in charge of Inglenook since 1939, John Daniel Jr., to plant grape vines on his estate.  were planted with Cabernet Sauvignon, and the fruit from the Cohn estate was sold to Inglenook. In later years, the fruit from the J.J. Cohn Estate was sold to Opus One, Joseph Phelps Vineyards, Robert Mondavi Winery and Beaulieu Vineyard.

Cohn died in 1996 aged 100, and the heirs put the then  property up for sale to resolve the inheritance dispute, and a value estimation at $4 million in 1996 rose to $33.6 million by 2002, when Francis Ford Coppola of the Rubicon Estate Winery eventually purchased the property in a package deal with Cohn's grandson Bret Lopez.

The wine's name was decided upon by Lopez and DeBlasio in honor of Cohn. Following the engagement of winemaker Celia Welch, the debut vintage of 2003 became successful, while later vintages have rapidly established Scarecrow as a cult wine.

At the April 2009 Premiere Napa Valley auction, a lot of five cases of Scarecrow was sold for $80,000.

At the February 2011 Premiere Napa Valley auction, a lot of five cases of Scarecrow Wine was sold for $125,000, breaking previous PNV records.  The lot was purchased by Ichizo Nakagawa, owner of Tokyo-based Nakagawa Wine Company.

Production
The estate extends  under vine, of 100% Cabernet Sauvignon with 5.5 tons of fruit from the "House block", 2 tons from the "Hillside block" and 1.5 tons from the "Old Men block" planted in 1945.

References

External links
 

Wineries in California
1945 establishments in California